Thrill of a Lifetime is the second album (and the last to feature Mark Free on vocals) by the American hard rock band King Kobra, released in 1986 by Capitol Records. The album features "Iron Eagle (Never Say Die)", the theme song of the 1986 film Iron Eagle. The music video of the song features Louis Gossett Jr. as Charles "Chappy" Sinclair from the film as the band members (dropping their glam rock looks) going through vigorous boot camp training.

Track listing
All tracks by King Kobra, except where indicated

"Second Time Around" - 4:08
"Dream On" (Russ Ballard) - 4:29
"Feel the Heat" (King Kobra, Scott St. Clair Sheets) - 3:58
"Thrill of a Lifetime" - 4:12
"Only the Strong Will Survive" (King Kobra, St. Clair Sheets) - 4:00
"Iron Eagle (Never Say Die)" (Duane Hitchings, Jake Hooker)- 3:32
"Home Street Home" - 4:20
"Overnight Sensation" - 4:19
"Raise Your Hands to Rock" - 3:47
"Party Animal" - 3:57

Personnel
Production and performance credits are adapted from the album liner notes.

King Kobra
Mark Free – lead vocals, backing vocals
David Michael-Philips – lead and rhythm guitars, guitar synthesizer and backing vocals
Mick Sweda – lead and rhythm guitars, guitar synthesizer and backing vocals
Johnny Rod – bass guitar, backing vocals
Carmine Appice – drums, electric and acoustic percussion, backing vocals

Additional musicians
Duane Hitchings – keyboards

Production
Mixed at Pasha Music House, North Hollywood, California
Produced by Carmine Appice and Duane Hitchings with Spencer Proffer for Pasha
Arranged by King Kobra & Duane Hitchings
Jake Hooker – production on "Iron Eagle (Never Say Die)"
Ritchie Podolor – mixing on "Iron Eagle (Never Say Die)"
Bill Cooper – engineer, mixing on "Iron Eagle (Never Say Die)"
Hanspeter Huber – engineer
Spencer Proffer, Alex Woltman – additional engineering
Steve Hall – mastering at Future Disc, Hollywood, California
Ted Raess – art direction and design for Raess Design
King Kobra, Alan Miller – cover concept
Von Thomas – photography
Digital Art – computer graphics
Carol Peters – coordination for Pasha
Ray Tusken – A&R coordination
Alan Miller – management for Miller Management

External links
 King Kobra - Thrill of a Lifetime CD

References

1986 albums
King Kobra albums
Capitol Records albums